Richard Christopher Refshauge  (born 1947) is a former Australian judge.

Early life
Refshauge was born in 1947, the son of Major General Sir William Refshauge and his wife Helen (née Allwright). One brother is Andrew, who went on to become Deputy Premier of New South Wales. He was educated at the Australian National University, graduating BA (Hons) in 1972 and LLB in 1975. He was president of the Australian National University Students' Association in 1972.

Career
Refshauge worked for Canberra law firm Macphillamy Cummins & Gibson from 1976, becoming a partner in 1981 and the senior partner in 1992. The firm merged with Sly & Weigall in 1994 which then changed its name to Deacons Graham & James in 1995 (subsequently acquired by Norton Rose).

From 1980 Refshauge taught part-time in what was then called the Faculty of Law at the ANU. From 2001 he was an adjunct professor. He is the editor of the standard text on court practice in the ACT, Civil Procedure ACT.

In 1998 Refshauge was appointed Australian Capital Territory Director of Public Prosecutions. In 2008 he was appointed a judge of the Supreme Court of the Australian Capital Territory. He retired from the Supreme Court in 2017 on reaching the statutory retirement age of 70. He was appointed Acting Judge of the ACT Drug and Alcohol Court in 2020.

Personal life
Refshauge is married to Barbara.

References

1947 births
Living people
Judges of the Supreme Court of the Australian Capital Territory
Australian National University alumni